Gary Wayne Majewski (born February 26, 1980) is an American former professional baseball pitcher. He played for the Montreal Expos, Washington Nationals, Cincinnati Reds, and Houston Astros of Major League Baseball (MLB).

Career
Majewski graduated in 1998 from St. Pius X High School in Houston, where he was unanimously selected for Houston Player of the Year for his achievement of maintaining a 1.64 ERA and a 14-3 record. With that, he led his team to the state championship in Class 5A TAPPS.

In the majors, Majewski had an ERA of 2.93 and 4 wins and 4 losses during the  season. In his career, he pitched 242.1 innings.

Majewski was traded by the Washington Nationals to the Cincinnati Reds along with Bill Bray, Royce Clayton, and Brendan Harris for Austin Kearns, Felipe López, and Ryan Wagner.  The trade caused some controversy, as the Reds front office was apparently unaware of cortisone shots which had been given to Majewski due to arm pain before the trade.  It was alleged Majeski was known to be injured by Washington GM Jim Bowden and the trade was an attempt to dump him for some value to some unsuspecting team.  In his time with the Nationals Majewski was very good, with a 2.93 ERA in 2005 and a 3.58 ERA with Washington up until he was traded.

With the Reds he had very little success, with a 7.28 ERA in parts of three seasons.  He was not re-signed after the 2008 season and pitched in only two games in the Major Leagues thereafter.  A grievance was filed with MLB alleging misconduct by Jim Bowden and the Washington Nationals. However, MLB never revealed their findings and no punishment is on record.

On December 23, 2008, Majewski signed a minor league contract with the Philadelphia Phillies.

In December 2009 Majewski signed a minor league contract with the Houston Astros. On July 18, 2010, he was purchased from Triple-A Round Rock then was designated for assignment on July 21.

In March 2012 Majewski was signed by the Sugar Land Skeeters, an American professional baseball team based in Sugar Land, Texas, where he pitched in 56 games for the Skeeters during the 2012 season, compiling an ERA of 3.37.

References

External links

1980 births
Living people
Águilas Cibaeñas players
American expatriate baseball players in the Dominican Republic
American expatriate baseball players in Canada
American expatriate baseball players in Mexico
American people of Polish descent
Baseball players from Houston
Birmingham Barons players
Bristol White Sox players
Burlington Bees players
Charlotte Knights players
Cincinnati Reds players
Edmonton Trappers players
Gigantes de Carolina players
Houston Astros players
Lehigh Valley IronPigs players
Louisville Bats players
Major League Baseball pitchers
Mexican League baseball pitchers
Montreal Expos players
New Orleans Zephyrs players
Peoria Javelinas players
Piratas de Campeche players
Round Rock Express players
Saraperos de Saltillo players
Sugar Land Skeeters players
Tomateros de Culiacán players
Vero Beach Dodgers players
Washington Nationals players
Winston-Salem Warthogs players
World Baseball Classic players of the United States
2006 World Baseball Classic players